Gridino is a rural locality (a village) in Vyatkinskoye Rural Settlement, Sudogodsky District, Vladimir Oblast, Russia. The population was 234 as of 2010.

Geography 
The village is located 21 km south from Vladimir, 43 km north-west from Sudogda.

References 

Rural localities in Sudogodsky District